Jerry Schumacher is an American coach for the University of Oregon track and field and cross country program, specializing in distance running. He has coached Olympic silver medalist and the former American women's 10k record holder Shalane Flanagan, former Canadian 10k record holder Simon Bairu, the former men's American 10k record holder Chris Solinsky, the men's American two mile record holder Matt Tegenkamp, and the women's NCAA 10k record holder Lisa Koll. Prior to 2008 he was the head coach of the University of Wisconsin–Madison track and field team.

During his college years at the University of Wisconsin, Schumacher specialized in the 1500m, an event in which he would become an All-American and set a personal best of 3:39.

After a brief period of post-collegiate running, Schumacher quickly transitioned into coaching, accepting a job as an assistant coach at the University of North Carolina.

The Head Men's Distance Coaching job at Wisconsin opened up, and it was an easy decision to move back to his home state and coach the Badgers. Over the next 9 years, Schumacher established Wisconsin as one of the premier distance schools in the country by bringing in top-level recruits and slowly developing his athletes.

He is now the coach of the Bowerman Track Club, a running club based in Portland, Oregon which has produced 28 Olympians during his tenure. In July 2022, the University of Oregon announced the hire of Schumacher as head Cross Country and Track and Field Coach, replacing Robert Johnson.

Schumacher is the father of 4 children.

References

Year of birth missing (living people)
Living people
American track and field coaches
Wisconsin Badgers track and field coaches
North Carolina Tar Heels track and field coaches